Wild Gals A Go-Go is an album by Acid Mothers Temple & The Melting Paraiso U.F.O., self-released in 1999. The album is presented as if it were the soundtrack to a Russian pornographic film by a director named Ivan Piskov.

Release

The album was originally self-released by Acid Mothers Temple & The Melting Paraiso U.F.O. on CD in 1999 and limited to 1300 copies. The album was later released as a vinyl LP by Eclipse Records in 2004.

Track listing

Personnel
 Cotton Casino - vocal, synthesizer
 Tsuyama Atsushi - bass, vocal, acoustic guitar
 Koizumi Hajime - drums, monk
 Higashi Hiroshi - synthesizer
 Kawabata Makoto - electric guitars, bowed sitar, q'anoon, electric organ, keyboard, RDS900

Additional personnel
 Yoshida Masayuki - keyboards
 Kaneko Tetsuya - tabla
 YoKo - drone machine, photo
 Eddie & Bill (COA) - French voices

Technical personnel

 Kotani Tetsuya - Kotani Tetsuya at Omega Sound
 ELF - Artwork
 Sachiko Ichikawa - Artwork

References

Acid Mothers Temple albums
1999 albums